
This is a list of tunnels documented by the Historic American Engineering Record in the US state of California.

Tunnels

See also
List of bridges documented by the Historic American Engineering Record in California

Notes

References

List
List
California
Tunnels, HAER
Tunnels, HAER